Stephanie VanBrakle Prothro is an American former softball player and current head coach at Memphis. She previously served as the head coach at Samford and Birmingham–Southern.

Coaching career

Alabama
On July 11, 2011, VanBrakle Prothro was named pitching coach for Alabama.

Memphis
On August 18, 2022, VanBrakle Prothro was named head coach of the Memphis Tigers softball team.

Personal life
VanBrakle Prothro is married to Quintin Prothro.

Head coaching record

References

Living people
American softball coaches
Female sports coaches
Alabama Crimson Tide softball players
Alabama Crimson Tide softball coaches
Memphis Tigers softball coaches
Samford Bulldogs softball coaches
1983 births